Powichthys is a genus of prehistoric lobe-finned fish which lived during the Devonian period. This fish it was small in size, about 30 cm. Prior to the discovery of P. spitsbergensis in 2004, the genus was known from a single type species, P. thorsteinssoni.

References 

Prehistoric lobe-finned fish genera
Devonian fish of Europe